was a Japanese mathematician working on Fourier series and analysis. He authored over 90 articles written in collaboration with 17 coauthors. The Sunouchi operators are named after him.

Selected publications

Sunouchi, Gen'ichirō, On the Walsh-Kaczmarz series. Proc. Amer. Math. Soc. 2, (1951). 5–11. 
Sunouchi, Gen'ichirō, Strong summability of Walsh-Fourier series. Tōhoku Math. J. (2) 16 1964 228–237.
Sunouchi, Gen'ichirō, Notes on Fourier analysis. XVIII. Absolute summability of series with constant terms. Tōhoku Math. J. (2) 1, (1949). 57–65.
Kaneko, Makoto; Sunouchi, Gen'ichirō, On the Littlewood-Paley and Marcinkiewicz functions in higher dimensions. Tōhoku Math. J. (2) 37 (1985), no. 3, 343–365.

References

1911 births
2008 deaths
20th-century Japanese mathematicians
21st-century Japanese mathematicians